Pseudotomus is an extinct genus of rodent from North America.

References

Eocene rodents
Eocene animals of North America
Prehistoric rodent genera